The Pakenham line is a commuter railway line in the city of Melbourne, Victoria, Australia. The line runs from Flinders Street station in central Melbourne to Pakenham station in the south-east, serving 27 stations via the City Loop, South Yarra, Caulfield, Oakleigh, and Dandenong. The line operates for approximately 20 hours a day (from approximately 4:00 am to around midnight) with 24 hour service available on Friday and Saturday nights. During peak hour, headways of up to 5 to 10 minutes are operated with services every 20 minutes during off-peak hours. Trains on the Pakenham line run with a seven-car formation operated by High Capacity Metro Trains.

Sections of the Pakenham line opened as early as 1859, with the line fully extended to Pakenham in October 1877. A limited number of stations were first opened, with infill stations progressively opened between 1879 and 2012. The line was built to connect Melbourne with the rural towns of Caulfield, Oakleigh, and Dandenong, amongst others. Significant growth has occurred since opening, with a plan to extend the Pakenham line one stop east to a new station in Pakenham East as part of the Level Crossing Removal Project. This extension is planned to open in 2024.

Since the 2010s, due to the heavily utilised infrastructure of the Pakenham line, significant improvements and upgrades have been made. A $15 billion upgrade of the corridor included the replacement of sleepers, the introduction of new signalling technology, the introduction of new rolling stock, the removal of all level crossings, and works associated with the Metro Tunnel project. These projects have improved the quality and safety of the line and will be completed by the opening of the Metro Tunnel in 2025.

History

19th century 
In 1877, the Pakenham line began operations from Oakleigh to Bunyip, as part of the main line to Gippsland. The section from Oakleigh to Flinders Street station was connected at South Yarra in April 1879. In 1877, the Pakenham line began operations from Oakleigh to Bunyip, as part of the single-tracked main line to Gippsland, with an extension of the duplicated section of the line opening in 1881 to Caulfield, Oakleigh in 1883, and Dandenong in 1891. In 1883 the line between Richmond station and South Yarra was quadrupled to accommodate an increase in train services due to the opening of Frankston and Sandringham lines.

In 1885, a number of level crossing removal works occurred between Flinders Street station and South Yarra due to an increase in freight and passenger operations. These crossings were removed through a combination of lowering and raising the corridor.

20th century 

In 1915, the line between South Yarra and Caulfield was quadrupled, as part of level crossing removal works. This section of the line was lowered into a cutting to eliminate numerous level crossings. Power signalling was provided between Richmond and Hawksburn at the same time, then on to Caulfield in 1921.

Electrification of the line to Dandenong occurred in two stages during 1922. In May 1922, the section from South Yarra to Oakleigh station was electrified, with the section to Dandenong being electrified later in December 1922. The electrification of the line allowed for the introduction of Swing Door electric multiple unit trains for the first time. 

Power signalling was extended to Carnegie in 1933, Oakleigh in 1940, and to Dandenong in stages between 1970 and 1972.

The line between Dandenong, Pakenham and Traralgon was electrified in 1954. Initially single track, duplication of the line between Dandenong, Pakenham and Nar Nar Goon was completed in 1955 and 1956. Suburban services were extended beyond Dandenong to Pakenham in January 1975. Previously, the stations between Dandenong and Pakenham were only served by regional passenger trains connecting Gippsland to Melbourne.

In 1981, Pakenham line services commenced operations through the City Loop, after previously terminating at Flinders or Spencer Street stations. The commencement of operations involved the service stopping at three new stations—Parliament, Melbourne Central (formally Museum), and Flagstaff. The Loop follows La Trobe and Spring Streets along the northern and eastern edges of the Hoddle Grid. The Loop connects with Melbourne's two busiest stations, Flinders Street and Southern Cross, via the elevated Flinders Street Viaduct. From 2025, the Pakenham line will no longer operate through the City Loop, instead operating via the north-south Metro Tunnel corridor.

21st century 

In 2002, after the closure of the nearby General Motors factory in 1991, General Motors station closed permanently after 46 years of operation. A 2007 restructure of train ticketing in Melbourne involved the removal of Zone 3, with Zone 3 stations being re-classified to Zone 2. This brought the cost of train fares down, improving system accessibility to the public.

The Pakenham line received heavy investment during the 2010s to align with the 2013 PTV Development Plan. A new station at Cardinia Road opened in 2012 situated between Officer and Pakenham stations. This is the first infill station to open on the line since 1927, with an additional station at Pakenham East expected to open in 2024 in conjunction with level crossing removal works. In 2018, the Pakenham East Depot opened for the newly acquired High Capacity Metro Trains. This depot has stabling capacity for 30 seven-car trains with train maintenance, driver training, and washing facilities present onsite.

Future

Metro Tunnel 

The 2012 Network Development Plan identified the need for a north-south tunnel connecting the Cranbourne and Pakenham lines to the Sunbury line. In 2017, the Metro Tunnel began construction, involving the construction of five new underground stations, twin  tunnels, and other associated infrastructure improvements. Leaving the existing Pakenham line alignment before South Yarra station, new stations will be built at Anzac, Town Hall (with connections to Flinders Street station), State Library (with connections to Melbourne Central), Parkville, and Arden, before continuing onto the Sunbury line. These works will be completed by 2025, and upon completion, will create a singular rail line from Cranbourne and Pakenham to Sunbury and Melbourne Airport (from 2029).

Melbourne Airport rail 

The Melbourne Airport rail link will involve the construction of a  line from Sunshine to a new station at Melbourne Airport. Connected via the Metro Tunnel, services will operate from the Cranbourne and Pakenham lines through the tunnel before splitting off at Sunshine to either Sunbury or Melbourne Airport. Construction of the line will involve the renovation of Sunshine station to allow for additional platforms, construction of new track, and the addition of two new stations at Keilor East and Melbourne Airport. Construction started in 2022 with services expected to begin in 2029.

Pakenham East line extension 
Announced in 2021, the Pakenham line will be extended one stop east to Pakenham East. The extension will involve the removal of the Main Street and Racecourse Road level crossings, the elevation of Pakenham station, the construction of a new station at Pakenham East, and other associated safety and landscape works. These works will be undertaken as part of the Level Crossing Removal Project and will be completed by 2024.

Level Crossing Removals 
The Level Crossing Removal Project has announced the removal of all 22 remaining level crossings on the Pakenham line, to be completed in stages from 2018 to 2025. All level crossings between Caulfield and Dandenong were removed in 2018 as part of the Caulfield to Dandenong skyrail project. This included the removal of nine level crossings and the reconstruction of five elevated stations along the corridor. The second phase of removals involves removing individual crossings along the corridor through a variety of methods by 2025. Some crossings have been removed through elevating the rail corridor, some by lowering or raising the road, with other crossings being removed by closing the crossing off from motor traffic. These projects will leave the entirety of the Pakenham line level crossing free by 2025, with projects on the Sunbury line leaving the entire Sunshine-Dandenong corridor crossing free by the opening of the Metro Tunnel in 2025.

Network and operations

Services 
Services on the Pakenham line operates from approximately 4:00 am to around 11:30 daily. In general, during peak hours, train frequency is 5 minutes on the Dandenong corridor (combined with the Cranbourne line) and 10 minutes in the AM peak on the Pakenham Line while during non-peak hours the frequency is reduced to 20–30 minutes throughout the entire route. Services run anticlockwise through the City Loop, and from 2025, Pakenham line services will cease to stop at South Yarra, Richmond, and all City Loop stations when trains are rerouted through the Metro Tunnel upon opening. On Friday nights and weekends, services run 24 hours a day, with 60 minute frequencies available outside of normal operating hours. Since 13 February 2022, some off-peak daytime Pakenham line services (and Cranbourne line services) stop at Malvern station, running express between South Yarra and Malvern stations.

Train services on the Pakenham line are also subjected to maintenance and renewal works, usually on selected Fridays and Saturdays. Shuttle bus services are provided throughout the duration of works for affected commuters.

Stopping Patterns 
Legend — Station Status
 ◼ Premium Station – Station staffed from first to last train
 ◻ Host Station – Usually staffed during morning peak, however this can vary for different stations on the network.

Legend — Stopping Patterns
Some services do not operate via the City Loop
 ● – All trains stop
 ◐ – Some services do not stop
 ▲ – Only inbound trains stop (trains operate counter-clockwise through the city loop all day)
 ▼ – Only outbound trains stop
 | – Trains pass and do not stop

Operators 
The Pakenham line has had a total of 6 operators since its opening in 1877. The majority of operations throughout its history have been government run: from its first service in 1877 until the 1997 privatisation of Melbourne's rail network, three different government operators have run the line. These operators, Victorian Railways, the Metropolitan Transit Authority, and the Public Transport Corporation have a combined operational length of 120 years. In comparison, the three private operators, M-Train, Connex Melbourne, and Metro Trains Melbourne have had a combined operational period of  years.

Route 

The Pakenham line forms a relatively linear route from the Melbourne central business district to its terminus in Pakenham. After Caulfield station, the track again narrows to 2 tracks, which is remain for the rest of the route. The only underground section of the Pakenham line is in the City Loop, where the service stops at 3 underground stations. Exiting the city, the Pakenham line traverses mainly flat country with few curves and fairly minimal earthworks for most of the line. However, between South Yarra and Malvern, the rail corridor has been lowered into a cutting to eliminate level crossings, and between Malvern and Caulfield, the corridor has been raised on an embankment for the same reason. After Caulfield, the line formerly had numerous level crossings, however, all have now been abolished between Caulfield and Dandenong as part of an elevated rail project, as well as some older bridges over and under roads. Remaining level crossings between Dandenong and Pakenham stations will be removed by 2025 under smaller level crossing removal works. 

The line follows the same alignment as the Cranbourne line with the two services splitting onto different routes at Dandenong. The Pakenham line continues on its eastern alignment, whereas the Cranbourne line takes a southerly alignment towards its final destination of Cranbourne station. Most of the rail line goes through built-up suburbs and some industrial areas, but after Dandenong, the line gets into more open countryside, passing by open fields and farms, particularly after Beaconsfield. This outer portion of the line is one of Melbourne's main growth corridors, which is rapidly replacing farmland with housing and commercial developments causing a rise in patronage.

Stations 
The line serves 27 stations across  of track. The stations are a mix of elevated, lowered, underground, and ground level designs. Underground stations are present only in the City Loop, with the majority of elevated and lowered stations being constructed as part of level crossing removals. From 2025, services will cease to stop at Flinders Street, Southern Cross, Flagstaff, Melbourne Central, Parliament, Richmond, and South Yarra stations due to the opening of the Metro Tunnel. Also from 2025, Narre Warren and Pakenham stations will be elevated as part of level crossing removal works.

Planned stations

Infrastructure

Rolling stock 

The Pakenham line uses electric multiple unit (EMU) trains operating in a seven-car configuration, with three doors per side on each carriage and can accommodate of up to 1,380 passengers in each train-set. Shared with the Cranbourne, Sunbury, and Airport lines, the rolling stock will consist of 70 High Capacity Metro Trains (HCMT), once fully delivered. They are built in Changchun, China, with final assembly occurring in Newport, Melbourne, by Evolution Rail, a consortium composed of CRRC Changchun Railway Vehicles, Downer Rail and Plenary Group.
Previously, the Pakenham line was served by a fleet of Comeng and Siemens Nexas trains. The oldest Comeng trains (stage 1 and some stage 2) have been retired and scrapped as part of the HCMT introduction, however, some of these trains have been displaced onto other Melbourne metropolitan lines. In comparison, the Siemens Nexas trains have not been retired, instead being moved onto other lines to replace older Comeng sets. At the end of 2022, the Pakenham line is almost exclusively operated by High Capacity Metro Trains.

Alongside the passenger trains, Pakenham line tracks and equipment are maintained by a fleet of engineering trains. The four types of engineering trains are: the shunting train; designed for moving trains along non-electrified corridors and for transporting other maintenance locomotives, for track evaluation; designed for evaluating track and its condition, the overhead inspection train; designed for overhead wiring inspection, and the infrastructure evaluation carriage designed for general infrastructure evaluation. Most of these trains are repurposed locomotives previously used by V/Line, Metro Trains, and the Southern Shorthaul Railroad.

Accessibility 

In compliance with the Disability Discrimination Act of 1992, all stations that are new-built or rebuilt are fully accessible and comply with these guidelines. The majority of stations on the corridor are fully accessible, however, there are some stations that haven't been upgraded to meet these guidelines. These stations do feature ramps, however, they have a gradient greater than 1 in 14. Stations that are fully accessible feature ramps that have a gradient less than 1 in 14, have at-grade paths, or feature lifts. These stations typically also feature tactile boarding indicators, independent boarding ramps, wheelchair accessible myki barriers, hearing loops, and widened paths.

Projects improving station accessibility have included the Level Crossing Removal Project, which involves station rebuilds and upgrades, individual station upgrade projects, and associated Metro Tunnel works. These works have made significant strides in improving network accessibility, with more than 60% of Pakenham line stations classed as fully accessible. This number is expected to grow within the coming years, as a network restructure associated with the opening of the Metro Tunnel is completed and the completion of level crossing removal works on the corridor by 2025.

Signalling 

Since the mid to late 20th century, the Pakenham line has used a fixed block three position signalling system designed for lower frequencies and less services. However, the ageing system had undermined reliability due to the presence of system faults and limited frequencies, requiring the Pakenham, Cranbourne, and Sunbury lines to upgrade their signalling system. Since 2021, high-capacity signalling (HCS) has been rolling out on the Pakenham, Cranbourne, and Sunbury lines, allowing trains to safely run closer together and run more frequently. The new system is being delivered by CPB Contractors and Bombardier Transportation under the Rail Systems Alliance. The line will be equipped with Bombardier’s CityFlo 650 communications-based train control system, which will enable operation at 2–3 minute headways.

The upgrading works were completed in phases from 2021. With the upgraded signalling system, trains are now able to run closer to each other. The new system was tested on the Mernda line and a section of the Cranbourne line before being fully implemented on the lines. In March 2022, the Pakenham line underwent further testing of high-tech signalling equipment, to ensure the new trains and signalling system can safely run alongside older-generation trains—including freight and V/Line trains—and the existing signalling system.

References

External links
 Pakenham line timetable
 Network map
 

Railway lines in Melbourne
Railway lines opened in 1877
5 ft 3 in gauge railways in Australia
1879 establishments in Australia
Transport in the City of Stonnington
Transport in the City of Glen Eira
Transport in the City of Monash
Transport in the City of Kingston (Victoria)
Transport in the City of Greater Dandenong
Transport in the City of Casey
Transport in the Shire of Cardinia
Public transport routes in the City of Melbourne (LGA)
1500 V DC railway electrification